Honoré Bailet (27 February 1920 – 16 September 2003) was a French politician and businessman. He was a member of the Rally for the Republic party. He served as Mayor of Nice from 26 September 1990 to 29 October 1993. He was senator of the Alpes-Maritimes from 24 September 1989 to 30 September 1998. He was appointed first deputy mayor of Nice in 1989.

Biography
Honoré Bailet was born in Nice, France on 27 February 1920 and died in Nice, France at the age of 83. The municipal council of Nice elected Honoré Bailet mayor of Nice to succeed Jacques Médecin.

References 

Rally for the Republic politicians
20th-century French politicians
21st-century French politicians
Mayors of Nice
1920 births
2003 deaths
People from Nice